Gilbert Erwin Steinke (May 3, 1919 – May 10, 1995) was an American football player and coach.  He served as the head football coach of at Texas A&I University—now known as Texas A&M University–Kingsville—from 1954 to 1976 after having played at Texas A&I and then professionally in the National Football League (NFL) for the Philadelphia Eagles.  Steinke led the Texas A&I Javelinas to six NAIA Football National Championships, in 1959, 1969, 1970, 1974, 1975, and 1976.  He was inducted into the College Football Hall of Fame as a coach in 1996.

Early life and playing career
Steinke was born May 3, 1919 in Brenham, Texas.  He had his right hand severely mauled by a lawn mower, cutting three fingers down to the nubs.

After graduating from high school in the coastal town of Ganado, Texas, Steinke began his football career as a player at Texas A&I, where he won all-conference honors on offense and defense.  Steinke played with the Philadelphia Eagles from 1945 to 1948 and led the NFL in punt returns with a 14.8 average in 1947.  As a starting safety, he helped the Eagles win a world title in 1948.

Coaching career
After coaching in the high school ranks and at Oklahoma State, Trinity and Texas A&M, Steinke returned to his alma mater to become the athletic director and head football coach at Texas A&I from 1954 to 1976.  He directed the Javelinas to 39 consecutive triumphs and six NAIA football national titles, including three in a row from 1974 to 1976.  By the end of his 23-year coaching career at A&I, he had achieved ten Lone Star Conference championship trophies and 186 wins against only 62 losses and four ties.  Steinke was inducted into the Texas Sports Hall of Fame in 1977 and the College Football Hall of Fame in 1996. 

Later he tried his hand in the professional ranks as coach and general manager of the United States Football League's San Antonio Gunslingers. By the time he arrived in 1984, he was showing unmistakable signs of mental deterioration, almost to the point of senility. He often forgot plays and play calls, and got lost in cities that he ostensibly knew well. Despite this, he managed to keep the Gunslingers competitive, rallying a team with little talent on paper to a 7-7 finish after an 0-4 start, keeping them in playoff contention until the last few weeks of the season. After retiring to focus on his general manager duties in 1985, he was forced to take over as interim head coach for the last six games of the season after his successor, Jim Bates, resigned after several missed payrolls.

Role in integration
Steinke was one of the early proponents of integrating Southern football. He was well known for walking out of restaurants and motels that would not take blacks and whites, and bringing on many black and Hispanic players regardless of social or financial status. "We integrated football in Texas," Steinke told the Houston Chronicle in 1989. "We had Sid Blanks (later a Houston Oiler) before anyone else integrated."

Trademarks
Steinke was known for coaching from the stands to get a better view of the game, using runners to deliver plays to the team.

Death
Steinke died May 10, 1995 in Austin, Texas. He is buried in Masonic Cemetery, in  Caldwell, Texas.

Head coaching record

College

Professional

References

External links
 
 
 

1919 births
1995 deaths
American football halfbacks
Oklahoma State Cowboys football coaches
Philadelphia Eagles players
Texas A&M Aggies football coaches
Texas A&M–Kingsville Javelinas athletic directors
Texas A&M–Kingsville Javelinas football coaches
Texas A&M–Kingsville Javelinas football players
Trinity Tigers football coaches
United States Football League coaches
College Football Hall of Fame inductees
People from Brenham, Texas
Coaches of American football from Texas
Players of American football from Texas